The Katmerciler Hızır is a family of MRAP (Mine Resistant Ambush Protected) armoured personnel carriers designed and produced by Turkish company Katmerciler. Hızır is capable of carrying up to nine personnel and it's various modifications can perform a wide variety of tasks, such as military personnel transportation, medical evacuation, engaging in armed combat, serving as a mobile command and control center or weapons carrier platform, conducting military reconnaissance and border patrol missions or providing CBRN defence. The name Hızır is the Turkish variant of Khidr, the colloquial names associated with an unnamed figure described in the Quran who is said to have shared wisdom with Moses.

Variants 
The Ateş (lit. "Flame"), Hızır's border patrol and reconnaissance variant, operated by Turkish Land Forces, is a Hızır 4x4 vehicle integrated with Aselsan's high-tech reconnaissance, surveillance systems and environmental monitoring radar. The Ateş variant was designed to meet border security requirements set up by the European Union-funded project to "Supply Mobile Surveillance Units for Increasing Border Surveillance Capacity of Borders between Turkey and EU", which contributed 27.6 million euros, or 75% of the project's cost. Ateş can carry out reconnaissance and surveillance missions in day and night conditions with a range of 40 km. It can carry up to six personnel, two of which are crew (driver and commander).

The Hızır II (or Hızır 2) was unveiled at the İDEF defence expo in August 2021.

Operators 

 : 57 Hızır 4x4 Ateş border patrol variants operated by Turkish Land Forces
: 118 Hızır 4x4 MRAPs ordered to be operated by Kenya Defence Forces.
: 1 Hızır 4x4 Ateş procured in October 2021 to be used by the Uruguay Mechanized Infantry Unit under the United Nations Disengagement Observer Force mission.
: 20 Hızır 4x4 MRAPs ordered to be operated by Gambia Armed Forces. Deliveries began in October 2022, with first few examples already accepted into service.

Potential Users 
 : While the sale was never officially announced, at least 15 such vehicles are rumored to be in possession of Uganda People's Defence Force after the company released a statement about exporting MRAPs to an unnamed "African customer" in July 2019 along with a photo of 15 Hızırs being loaded onto a ship, later followed by video emerging of at least a dozen Hızır 4x4 vehicles driving through the streets of Uganda in early 2021.

References 

Wheeled armoured fighting vehicles
Internal security vehicles
Armoured fighting vehicles of Turkey
Reconnaissance vehicles